The 2021–22 James Madison Dukes men's basketball team represented James Madison University in the 2021–22 NCAA Division I men's basketball season. The Dukes, led by second-year head coach Mark Byington, played their home games at the Atlantic Union Bank Center in Harrisonburg, Virginia as members of the Colonial Athletic Association. They finished the season 15–14, 6–12 in CAA play to finish in eighth place.

On November 6, 2021, the school announced that it would leave the CAA to join the Sun Belt Conference effective June 30, 2022. In response, the CAA banned the Dukes from all CAA championships for the remainder of their time in the conference, including the CAA tournament.

Previous season
In a season limited due to the ongoing COVID-19 pandemic, the Dukes finished the 2020–21 season finished the season 13–7, 8–2 in CAA play to earn a share of the regular season championship. They lost in the quarterfinals of the CAA tournament to Elon.

Byington was named the CAA Coach of the Year while guard Matt Lewis was named the CAA Player of the Year.

Preseason
In the conference's preseason poll, the Dukes were picked to finish fourth, but were one of six schools to receive first place votes. Additionally, guard Vado Morse was named to the preseason All-Conference Second Team while guard Takal Molson was an honorable mention.

Roster

Schedule and results 

|-
!colspan=12 style=|Non-conference regular season

|-
!colspan=9 style=|CAA regular season

References

James Madison Dukes men's basketball seasons
James Madison Dukes
James Madison Dukes men's basketball